The Kinmen County Council (KMCC) is the elected county council of Kinmen County, Republic of China. The council composes of 19 councilors lastly elected through the 2022 Republic of China local election on 26 November 2022.

Speakers
 Wang Zai-sheng (KMT) (1 March 2010-25 December 2014)
 Hung Li-ping (KMT) (25 December 2014-24 December 2018)
 Hung Yun-tien (KMT) (25 December 2018-incumbent)

Deputy Speakers
 Xu Jianzhong (KMT) (1 March 2010-25 December 2014)
 Shieh Tung-long (KMT) (25 December 2014-24 December 2018)
 Zhou Zijie (Independent) (25 December 2018-24 December 2022)
 Au Yang Yi-xong (KMT) (25 December 2022-incumbent)

See also
 Kinmen County Government

References

External links

 

County councils of Taiwan
Kinmen